Joseph Brincat (born 5 March 1970) is a Maltese former international footballer who earned a total of 103 caps for the Maltese national team, scoring five goals. He played for many clubs including Birkirkara FC, Sliema Wanderers, and Floriana.

Joe Brincat is a Hamrun Spartans product and started his career with the club at the age of 17 in the championship winning team of that same year. With the senior squad of Hamrun, Joe Brincat won the MFA Player of the year whilst donning the Hamrun Spartans shirt, while he was a key player in major trophies won by the Hamrun squad at the time, which include the Premier League three times, four times the FA trophy, 5 times the Maltese Super Cup and once the Euro Cup..

International career
Brincat played 103 times for the Maltese national football team, scoring five goals. He made his debut way back in October 1987 when the national team, then under coach Gencho Dobrev, played a friendly against England B who won 2–0. He made his last appearance for the Maltese national team in 2004 in a friendly tournament match against Moldova. Brincat is in third place for the all-time list of appearances for the Maltese national team.

Personal life
He is married to Rita and has two daughters - Beverly (born 1995) and Mariah (born 1999).

Career statistics

International goals

See also
 List of men's footballers with 100 or more international caps

References

1970 births
Living people
Association football midfielders
Maltese footballers
Malta international footballers
Birkirkara F.C. players
Sliema Wanderers F.C. players
Floriana F.C. players
FIFA Century Club